Perret's snout-burrower or Perret's shovelnose frog  (Hemisus perreti) is a species of frog in the family Hemisotidae. It is found in Gabon, western Republic of the Congo, the Cabinda enclave of Angola, and western Democratic Republic of the Congo.

Etymology
The specific name, perreti, honours , a Swiss herpetologist who has specialized in African amphibians.

Habitat and conservation
The species inhabits pristine lowland rainforest, secondary forest, forest patches in savanna, and forest along the savanna-forest transition zone. It is probably a common species, but its secretive and fossorial habits make it easy to overlook. Threats to this little known species are unknown.

References

perreti
Frogs of Africa
Amphibians of Angola
Amphibians of the Democratic Republic of the Congo
Amphibians of Gabon
Amphibians of the Republic of the Congo
Amphibians described in 1972
Taxa named by Raymond Laurent
Taxonomy articles created by Polbot